Ricky's Sports Theatre and Grill was an Oakland Raiders themed sports bar located in San Leandro, California.

Ricky's opened in 1946 as a steakhouse and became famous for being rated the number two best sports bar in America according to Sports Illustrated and the number twelve best sports bar in America according to CNN.

In July 2018, Raiders head coach Jon Gruden held a fan appreciation event at Ricky's that was attended by over 500 fans and featured Raiders general manager Reggie McKenzie, Raiders team owner Mark Davis and several Raiders legends.

Ricky's owner Ricky Ricardo died in November 2020 at age 75, the restaurant had been closed for months due to COVID-19. A GoFundMe crowdfunding campaign was launched in 2020 to save Ricky's.

The original Ricky's was opened by John Ricardo Sr. in 1946 and moved to San Leandro, California in 1960.

References

External links

Drinking establishments in the San Francisco Bay Area
Defunct drinking establishments in the United States
Restaurants in the San Francisco Bay Area
Defunct restaurants in the San Francisco Bay Area
Theme restaurants
Sports-themed restaurants
Restaurants established in 1946
Restaurants disestablished in 2020
Las Vegas Raiders
Buildings and structures in San Leandro, California
1946 establishments in California
2020 disestablishments in California